The 16th Asian Film Awards was held on March 12, 2023 at Hong Kong Jockey Club Auditorium in Hong Kong Palace Museum. The nominations were announced on January 6, 2023. At the 16th edition of the awards ceremony, 30 films from 22 regions and countries were shortlisted for 81 nominations. South Korean film Decision to Leave received 10 nominations most for any film whereas Drive My Car with eight nominations was second. 

, a Malaysian Chinese singer, actor and model was appointed as Youth Ambassador of the film awards. 

The award ceremony hosted by Grace Chan and Sammy Leung was held on 12 March 2023, where international actors and celebrities from Hong Kong walked the red carpet. Hiroshi Abe, Japanese model and actor, was presented with Excellence in Asian Cinema Award and 'Red Carpet Best Dressed Award', whereas AFA Next Generation Award was presented to Ji Chang-wook a South Korean actor and singer. Later, Sammo Hung, a martial arts veteran from Hong Kong was honoured with a Lifetime Achievement Award, and Tony Leung Chiu-wai, a Hong Kong actor and singer, was presented with Asian Film Contribution Award for his contribution to the Asian cinema and the best actor award for his performance in Where the Wind Blows. Drive My Car by Ryusuke Hamaguchi won the best film award and best direction was awarded to Hirokazu Kore-eda for Broker, whereas Tang Wei's performance in Decision to Leave got her the best actress award. 

The ceremony was aired live on YouTube channel of Asian Film Awards Academy.

Events
Asian Film Awards Academy is holding an exhibition to celebrate 15 Years of excellence of Asian Film Awards from 5 to 11 March, 2023 at Harbour City’s Ocean Terminal Main Concourse. It is a pre-event leading to the film awards ceremony.

Japanese traditional martial arts dance group 'ORIENTARHYTHM' and talented pianist  performed on stage during the ceremony.

Red Carpet Best Dressed Award

An award known as 'Best Dressed Award' is launched from this year ceremony. The award consists of a trophy designed by Hong Kong production and costume designer, William Chang and The Sail Melaka X iPANDAS Memorigin Tourbillon watch. Hiroshi Abe became the first recipient of the award.

Red Carpet Best Dressed Award Jury:
 Hun Kim, Designer Director of Karl Lagerfeld 
 William Chang, Oscar-nominated and renowned HK Art Director
 Winnie Wan, editor-in-chief of Elle Hong Kong
 Michele Reis, renowned artist & co-creator of M Sail Tower
 Dato’ Leong Sir Ley, Founder & Chairman of Sheng Tai International

Jury

 Zhang Yimou  as Jury President - film director, producer, writer, actor and former cinematographer

Awards and nominations

Films with multiple nominations 
The following films received multiple nominations:

References

External links

Asian Film Awards ceremonies
2023 film awards
Film
Annual events in Hong Kong
2023 in South Korean cinema